Super Hits is a budget music compilation of Ricky Van Shelton released by Columbia Records after he had left the label. Sony Records re-released the compilation the same year under their budget label with a different cover. It includes many of his hit singles as well as album tracks.

Super Hits was certified Gold by the RIAA for sales of 500,000 copies.

Track listing

Critical reception

Super Hits received four out of five stars from Stephen Thomas Erlewine of Allmusic. Erlewine concludes that the album is "not bad" but "far from definitive.".

Chart performance
Super Hits peaked at #64 on the U.S. Billboard Top Country Albums chart the week of June 17, 1995.

References

Ricky Van Shelton albums
1995 greatest hits albums
Columbia Records compilation albums